Kidnapped (1938) is an adventure film directed by Otto Preminger (who was uncredited) and Alfred L. Werker, starring Warner Baxter and Freddie Bartholomew, and based on the 1886 novel Kidnapped by Robert Louis Stevenson.

The copyright of the film was renewed.

Plot 
In 1747, David Balfour's evil uncle arranges for him to be kidnapped and sent to sea where he meets exiled Alan Breck. The two make their way back to Scotland and justice.

Cast
 Warner Baxter as Alan Breck
 Freddie Bartholomew as David Balfour
 Arleen Whelan as Jean MacDonald
 C. Aubrey Smith as Duke of Argyle
 Reginald Owen as Captain Hoseason
 John Carradine as Gordon
 Nigel Bruce as Neil MacDonald
 Miles Mander as Ebenezer Balfour 
 Ralph Forbes as James 
 H. B. Warner as Angus Rankeillor 
 Arthur Hohl as Riach 
 E. E. Clive as Minister MacDougall
 Halliwell Hobbes as Dominie Campbell 
 Montagu Love as Colonel Whitehead 
 Moroni Olsen as Douglas 
 Leonard Mudie as Red Fox 
 Mary Gordon as Mrs. MacDonald 
 C. Montague Shaw as Scotch Statesman 
 Russell Hicks as Bailiff 
 Holmes Herbert as Judge 
 Brandon Hurst as Doomster 
 Harry Tenbrook as Crewman (uncredited)

Production notes
 Production Dates: 3 Jan-mid-Mar 1938
 The film's credits open with a picture of Robert Louis Stevenson lying in bed writing.
 The screen credit for the title reads, "Robert Louis Stevenson's Kidnapped: The Adventures of David Balfour."
 In his autobiography, Otto Preminger recounts that he was surprised when, after having directed only two films in Hollywood, he was assigned to Kidnapped, a big-budget film. Preminger, who was not familiar with the book, read the script and complained to his friend, Gregory Ratoff, who was acting as Zanuck's assistant, that he did not want to direct the film because he had no understanding of the people in the part of the world where the story took place. Ratoff, however, persuaded him to accept. When Zanuck saw some of the rushes, he accused Preminger of cutting out a portion of the script without permission. During a heated argument, Preminger denied the charge, and when Zanuck yelled at him, Preminger yelled back. Preminger subsequently refused to apologize, and, according to the autobiography, because of the incident, he was prevented from working in Hollywood. He returned to stage direction and did not direct another film until 1943.
 Other films based on the same book include a 1948 Monogram release starring Roddy McDowell and Dan O'Herlihy and directed by William Beaudine; a 1960 Walt Disney production directed by Robert Stevenson and starring Peter Finch and James MacArthur; and a 1971 American International Pictures version, directed by Delbert Mann and starring Michael Caine and Lawrence Douglas.

See also
 List of American films of 1938
 Kidnapped (1960 film)

References

External links 
 
 
 Radio Times review of the film

1938 films
Films directed by Otto Preminger
Films directed by Alfred L. Werker
Films based on Kidnapped (novel)
1938 adventure films
American adventure films
20th Century Fox films
Films set in the 1740s
American black-and-white films
1930s English-language films
1930s American films